All Saints High School was a coeducational Catholic high school in Detroit, Michigan.

The school opened in 1922 and was operated by the Sisters, Servants of the Immaculate Heart of Mary.

Athletics
All Saints won the Class C Boys Basketball State Championship in 1968.

References

1922 establishments in Michigan
1970 disestablishments in Michigan
High schools in Detroit
Defunct Catholic secondary schools in Michigan